Antonio Pérez (born 22 October 1944) is a Spanish former freestyle swimmer. He competed in two events at the 1964 Summer Olympics.

References

External links
 

1944 births
Living people
Spanish male freestyle swimmers
Olympic swimmers of Spain
Swimmers at the 1964 Summer Olympics
Place of birth missing (living people)